Mary Edwell-Burke (1894–1988), was an Australian painter and carver.

Biography 
Edwell-Burke was born on 19 June 1894 in Sydney. She was the half-sister of Bernice E. Edwell. She studied at the East Sydney Technical College.

In the 1920s she exhibited with the Royal Art Society (as Mary Edwards). Edwell-Burke was a finalist for the Archibald Prize in 1921 and 1922. From 1935-1945 she exhibited with the Australian Watercolour Institute (as Mary Edwards).

In 1944 Edwell-Burke, along with Joseph Wolinski, brought legal action to overturn William Dobell's 1943 Archibald prize for his portrait Mr Joshua Smith, claiming the image was more a caricature than a portrait.

In 1945 her portrait of Dame Enid Lyons, was rejected as 'unsatisfactory’ by the Federal Government’s Historic Memorials Committee. Edwell-Burke subsequently moved to Fiji and changed her name from Mary Edwards to Mary Edwell-Burke.

Edwell-Burke died on 19 January 1988 in Fiji.

References

External links 
 images of works by Mary Edwell-Burke on Art Gallery of New South Wales

1894 births
1988 deaths
20th-century Australian women artists
20th-century Australian painters
20th-century Australian sculptors
Artists from Sydney
Australian women painters
Archibald Prize finalists
Australian women sculptors